Skindergade is a street in central Copenhagen, Denmark. Running roughly parallel to Strøget, to which it is connected through Jorcks Passage, it extends for approximately 400 metres from Gammeltorv to Købmagergade.

History
Its name dates back to the 15th century when it was a venue for leather craftsmen (skinder- derives from Danish "Skind", meaning skin) such as skinners, glovers, purse-, saddle- and shoemakers.

Notable buildings and residents
 

Pressens Hus at No. 5–7 is home to the Danish Media Association. It is a former commerce house from 1902, expanded with a glazed extension by Erik Korshagen in 1976.

Kunstnerkollegiet is located at No. 34. N. 45-47 was built for Georg Bestle's wine trading house. The rounded pediment features a relief of Neptune and Mercury.

Memorial plaque
The facade of no. 44 bears a memorial stone over six named members of Holger Danske who in 1945 were arrested there by Gestapo and subsequently executed in Ryvangen.

References

External links

Streets in Copenhagen